The Reliable Data Protocol (RDP) is a network transport protocol defined in RFC 908 and was updated in RFC 1151. It is meant to provide facilities for remote loading, debugging and bulk transfer of images and data.

The Reliable Data Protocol is located on the Transport Layer of the OSI model next to protocols like TCP and UDP. It is number 27 in the list of IP protocol numbers.

Similar to TCP, the Reliable Data Protocol is connection oriented, but, contrary to TCP, it does not require sequenced  delivery of segments.

The Reliable Data Protocol has not gained popularity, though experimental implementations for BSD exist.

References

See Also
 Reliable Data Transfer

Transport layer protocols
Internet protocols